Shubino is a rural locality (a village) in Denisovskoye Rural Settlement, Gorokhovetsky District, Vladimir Oblast, Russia. The population was 8 as of 2010.

Geography 
Shubino is located 19 km southwest of Gorokhovets (the district's administrative centre) by road. Yakutino is the nearest rural locality.

References 

Rural localities in Gorokhovetsky District